Ptarmigan Lake is located in Glacier National Park, in the U. S. state of Montana. Ptarmigan Lake is situated below the Ptarmigan Wall. The lake is a  hike from the Swiftcurrent Auto Camp Historic District by way of the Ptarmigan Trail. After another  hike from Ptarmigan Lake, the historic Ptarmigan Tunnel can be seen.

See also
List of lakes in Glacier County, Montana

References

Lakes of Glacier National Park (U.S.)
Lakes of Glacier County, Montana